Place Vendome is the debut album of the hard rock project Place Vendome. The songwriting for this album was provided by Dennis Ward (Pink Cream 69), with further contributions from David Readman and Alfred Koffler.

The album received very positive reviews and was hailed as vocalist's Michael Kiske's glorious return to a heavier rock sound, since his exit from the German power metal band Helloween in 1993.

It was released on 10 October 2005 with cover art credited to Carl André Beckston.

Track listing

Japanese Bonus Track

Credits

Band members
 Michael Kiske – vocals
 Uwe Reitenauer – guitars
 Dennis Ward – bass, producer
 Kosta Zafiriou – drums
 Gunther Werno - keyboards

Additional personnel
 Carolin Wolf - backing vocals (2, 4)
 Alfred Koffler - extra guitars (7, 8)

References

External links
 Frontiers Records official website - Place Vendome
 Michael Kiske official website - Biography

2005 albums
Place Vendome (band) albums
Frontiers Records albums
Albums produced by Dennis Ward (musician)